Rhys Shellard (born 25 June 1985) is a rugby union player for Cardiff RFC and Cardiff Blues in the Celtic League. He previously played with Aberdare RFC and most notably, Pontypridd RFC. At The end of the 2007–08 season Shellard left the Blues. Shellard's position of choice is as a back-row forward.

Rhys Shellard returned to Pontypridd for the 2012-2013 campaign.

He was selected in the Wales Sevens squad for 2012-13

References

External links
Pontypridd RFC profile
Cardiff Blues profile

1985 births
Living people
Aberdare RFC players
Cardiff Rugby players
Commonwealth Games rugby sevens players of Wales
Male rugby sevens players
People educated at St John the Baptist School, Aberdare
Pontypridd RFC players
Rugby sevens players at the 2010 Commonwealth Games
Rugby union players from Aberdare
Welsh rugby union players